The Battle of Mahbes was fought on 12 January 1985 during the Western Sahara War. As part of its Grand-Maghreb offensive, the Polisario Front, with heavy means (tanks and ground-to-air missiles), breaks through the wall of sand defended by the Royal Moroccan armed forces.

Background 

The town of Al Mahbes is located behind the 4th sand wall which was being completed.

Polisario forces in this regions was pushed back into their Algerian bases. They will make one last attempt to break through this confinement.

According to the Moroccan Army, the Polisario Front engaged three motorised battalions (on Land Rover), one battalion of T-55 tanks and one mechanised battalion on BMP-1.

Battle
The Polisario Front attacked a Moroccan detachment participating in the construction of the wall north of Wadi Tenuechad, 8 kilometres from the Algerian border. The battle took place on a front of about fifteen kilometres from 7 a.m. to 4 p.m. then, according to Morocco, the attackers withdrew towards Algeria.

A Moroccan Mirage F1 fighter jet was shot down by Sahrawi 2K12 Kub missile. Morocco claimed that it was fired "from a bordering territory", alluding to Algeria.

Casualties and consequences
Morocco announces that the Polisario's losses are 66 men, 6 T-55s, 2 BMP-1s and 6 other vehicles.

Rabat acknowledges that 25 Moroccan soldiers were killed and 48 wounded, while the Polisario communiqué announces the death of 311 soldiers, the capture of 3 other soldiers and the destruction of 17 tanks, 14 armoured personnel carriers and 21 other royal vehicles. This attack shows that the Polisario is still capable of launching heavy attacks and that the Moroccan defence wall is not impassable.

References 

History of Western Sahara
Al Mahbes 1985
Al Mahbes 1985
1985 in Africa
Al Mahbes 1985
1985 in Morocco